P-Valley is an American drama television series created by Katori Hall. The series is an adaptation of Hall's play Pussy Valley, and follows several people who work at a strip club in the Mississippi Delta. It stars Brandee Evans, Nicco Annan, J. Alphonse Nicholson, and Elarica Johnson. It premiered on Starz on July 12, 2020, and was renewed for a second season two weeks after its premiere. The second season premiered on June 3, 2022. In October 2022, the series was renewed for a third season.

P-Valley has received critical acclaim and garnered nominations from the GLAAD Media Awards, Independent Spirit Awards, TCA Awards, and the NAACP Image Awards.

Premise
The series follows the lives of employees working at a strip club called The Pynk in the fictional city of Chucalissa, Mississippi.

Cast

Main
 Brandee Evans as Mercedes Woodbine, a tough veteran stripper planning to leave The Pynk to open a dance gym
 Nicco Annan as Uncle Clifford Sayles, the non-binary owner and proprietor of The Pynk experiencing financial problems that threaten the club's survival
 Shannon Thornton as Keyshawn Harris / Miss Mississippi, a dancer and influencer experiencing abuse by her boyfriend and father of her children, Derrick
 Elarica Johnson as Hailey Colton / Autumn Night / Lakeisha Savage (seasons 1-2), a hurricane survivor who moves to Chucalissa from Texas after losing her daughter 
 Skyler Joy as Gidget, a former dancer at the Pynk 
 J. Alphonse Nicholson as LaMarques / Lil Murda, an aspiring rapper and Uncle Clifford's love interest
 Parker Sawyers as Andre Watkins, an associate at a commercial investment company trying to secure land for The Promised Land Casino and Resort
 Harriett D. Foy as Patrice Woodbine, a devout Christian, Mercedes' mother, and newly appointed mayor of Chucalissa 
 Tyler Lepley as Diamond (season 1; recurring season 2), The Pynk's bouncer and an Iraq War veteran
 Dan J. Johnson as Corbin Kyle, the co-owner of a valuable piece of land sought for purchase, and the biracial half-brother of Wayne and Wyatt
 Isaiah Washington as Mayor Tydell Ruffin (season 1; guest season 2), Chucalissa's mayor who is determined to bring economic development to the city
 Loretta Devine as Ernestine Sayles (season 1; recurring season 2), Uncle Clifford's grandmother and former owner of Earnestine's juke joint, renamed the Pynk
 Morocco Omari as Big L (season 2; recurring season 1), an employee at The Pynk and Uncle Clifford's trusted advisor and righthand man 
 Dominic DeVore as Duffy (season 2; recurring season 1), Gidget's ex-boyfriend and Roulette's love interest
 Jordan M. Cox as Derrick Wright (season 2; recurring season 1), Keyshawn's abusive boyfriend 
 Psalms Salazar as Whisper (season 2), a new dancer at The Pynk

Recurring
 Bertram Williams Jr. as Woddy, Lil Murda's manager
 Brandon Gilpin as DJ Neva Scared, the teenage DJ of The Pynk (pronounced Pank)
 Angela Davis as Eloise (season 1; guest season 2), Mayor Ruffin's assistant and former dancer at the Pynk.
 Steve Coulter as Tommy Bailey (season 1; guest season 2),  police sheriff.
 Azaria Carter as Terricka, Mercedes’ daughter and Patrice's granddaughter.
 Helen Goldsby as Shelle, Terricka's adoptive mother.
 Thomas Q. Jones as Mane, the leader of Chief-Fi-Chief gang.
 Ashani Roberts as Dr. Britney Seagram-Watkins, Andre's wife.
 Josh Ventura as Wayne Kyle, the son of a prominent businessman and co-owner of a cotton plantation. He is the brother of Wyatt and half-brother of Corbin.
 Taylor Selé (season 1) and Sherman Augustus (season 2) as Cedric "Coach" Haynes, Mercedes' frequent client.
 Cranston Johnson as Montavius (season 1), Hailey's abusive ex-boyfriend
 Blue Kimble as Rome (season 2; guest season 1), a music executive who worked with Keyshawn and Lil’ Murda.
 Gail Bean as Roulette, a new dancer at The Pynk (season 2)
 John Clarence Stewart as Thaddeus Wilks / Big Teak (season 2), a member of Lil Murda's gang the Hurt Village Hustlas, recently released from prison on parole 
 Shamika Cotton as Farrah Haynes (season 2), the wife of Mercedes' frequent client, Coach 
 Miracle Watts as Big Bone (season 2), The Pynk's new bartender

The Pynk Staff  
 Cherokee M. Hall as Extra Extra, a dancer at the Pynk
 Cmayla Neal as Jupiter, a dancer at the Pynk
 Chinet Scott as Brazil, a dancer at the Pynk
 Sharae Monique Williams as Peanut Butter, a dancer at the Pynk
 Melo J as Toy, a dancer at the Pynk
 Joselin Reyes as Maite (season 1) a former seamstress for the Pynk dancers.
 Toni Bryce as Nineveh (season 2; guest season 1), the current seamstress for the Pynk dancers.

Special Guest 

 Megan Thee Stallion as Tina (season 2)
Joseline Hernandez as Herself (season 2)

Episodes

Series overview

Season 1 (2020)

Season 2 (2022)

Production

Development
P-Valley, a television adaptation of Katori Hall's play Pussy Valley, first went into development at Starz in August 2016 after being shopped around to several networks. On November 26, 2018, it was announced that the network had given a series order to the adaptation with Chernin Entertainment producing the series and Karena Evans set to direct the first episode. The eight-episode first season was made using all women directors.

The series premiered on July 12, 2020, and was renewed for a second season on July 27, 2020. Season two had ten episodes with production starting in June 2021. On February 2, 2022, Hall announced that season two would take place a few months after the season one finale and would include the COVID-19 pandemic. The second season premiered on June 3, 2022. On October 20, 2022, Starz renewed the series for a third season.

Casting
 
On November 26, 2018, Brandee Evans, Nicco Annan, Shannon Thornton, and J. Alphonse Nicholson were cast, with Evans as Mercedes and Annan as Uncle Clifford, and Thornton and Nicholson as series regulars. On February 20, 2019, Parker Sawyers was cast as Andre Watkins, Elarica Johnson was cast as Autumn Night, and Harriett D. Foy was cast as Patrice Woodbine. On March 19, 2019, Tyler Lepley was cast as Diamond and Dan J. Johnson was cast as Corbin Kyle. On April 24, 2019, Isaiah Washington was cast in a recurring role. On June 24, 2019, Loretta Devine was cast in a recurring role and Skyler Joy was cast as Gidget. On June 25, 2019, Thomas Q. Jones was cast in a recurring role. On July 29, 2019, Josh Ventura was cast in a recurring role.

Psalms Salazar and Gail Bean were announced as new cast members for season 2 on February 2, 2022. Morocco Omari, Jordan M. Cox, and Dominic DeVore were promoted to series regulars. John Clarence Stewart, Shamika Cotton, and Miracle Watts were announced as recurring cast members on March 15, 2022. In 2021, Washington announced he would not return for the second season, stating that he had been fired by Lionsgate. Showrunner Katori Hall disputed that Washington was fired in an April 2022 interview with EW. After the season 2 finale it was announced that Elarica Johnson, whose character moved away from Chucalissa, would not return to the series.

Choreography 
Jamaica Craft serves as the show's choreographer. Before becoming a professional choreographer, she started her career dancing at TLC in Atlanta. The show has several body doubles and background dancers including Tess Artiste, Ashley Fox and Judy Gray. Professional exotic dancer Spyda is the stunt double for Brandee Evans.

Reception

Critical response
Review aggregator Rotten Tomatoes reported an approval rating of 100% for the first season based on 32 reviews, with an average rating of 8.7/10. The website's critics consensus reads, "A stunning, lyrical piece of neon noir, P-Valley explores the unseen lives of strippers in Mississippi through Katori Hall's singular gaze, celebrating the beauty of the craft without sugarcoating the challenges." On Metacritic, it has a weighted average score of 85 out of 100 based on 16 reviews, indicating "universal acclaim".

Referred to as a Southern Gothic by critics, season one was praised for its portrayal of the Black women strippers' lives. Hannah Giorgis of The Atlantic wrote, "P-Valley is lush, resplendent, and sometimes haunting. All of the women's strife occurs against the backdrop of sweeping southern vistas or kaleidoscopic lighting, often with eerily bouncing beats soundtracking their dances." Similarly, Tambay Obenson reviewed the show for IndieWire, "These are richly crafted characters in what is essentially a quasi-family. It's obvious Hall did her homework, talking to dozens of strippers over six years, to make the production as authentic as possible."

Critics also noted the portrayal of social issues. Eric Deggans stated in a review for NPR, "...between the storylines about domestic abuse and a secret casino project, we see takes on colorism, closeted gay men and the struggle to survive when you're poor, Black and outside polite society in the South."

Brandee Evans' acting received positive reception. Writing for The Ringer, Allison Herman stated, "Evans is more than capable of carrying the show herself, and discovery of a freshly minted actress adds to the thrill." Nicco Annan's portrayal of Uncle Clifford was named to THR's list of Best TV Performances of 2020.

The second season received mainly positive critical reception. It holds an 90% rating on Rotten Tomatoes based on ten critic ratings with an average rating of 8.0/10.

Ratings

Season 1

Season 2

Awards and nominations

References

External links
 Official website

2020 American television series debuts
2020s American black television series
2020s American drama television series
2020s American LGBT-related drama television series
English-language television shows
Starz original programming
Television series based on plays
Television shows set in Mississippi
LGBT African-American culture
Works about the sex industry
Television series by Chernin Entertainment
Southern Gothic television series
Television shows filmed in Atlanta